Keith Godard (31 May 1938 - 4 May 2020) was a British born graphic artist and designer who practiced in New York City. He was the principal artist at StudioWorks.

Early life and education

Godard was born in London during World War II. His father was a heraldic engraver. In 1951, his father took him to the Festival of Britain which exposed him to 50's modern design by the work of FHK Henrion, Abram Games, James Gardiner and the architecture of the 'Dome of Discovery' and the 'Skylon'. He studied and  graduated from the London College of Printing and Graphic Art in 1962 and continued his studies on a full scholarship from the London County Council for a MFA majoring in graphic design at  Yale University, School of Art and Architecture in 1967.

Professional career 

His first employment was with George Him, a Polish designer and illustrator.  He then worked for Town Magazine where he was responsible for typographic layouts.  He briefly worked for The Weekend Telegraph Magazine from 1964-1965 before going to Graduate School at Yale University. After graduation  Godard  worked at Fortune Magazine for six months.

Godard, with Craig Hodgetts, Bob Mangurian and Lester Walker, formed Works design Group in 1968. Their first design was the Creative Playthings store. Godard designed the graphics component.

From 1975 to 1985 he worked with new partners, Hans van Dijk and Stephanie Tevonian. During that tenure he designed in collaboration with Edwin Schlossberg the Macomber Farm out door exhibit, The Brooklyn Bridge Centennial Exhibition, The US Custom House Pavilion, 'In the Picture' for the Jewish Museum, aspects of The P.T. Barnum Museum exhibits, Manhattan Children's Museum installation 'Children's Art from Armenia', and four traveling exhibits for United Nations Agencies.

In 1986 Godard established StudioWorks where he is the principal designer, specializing in exhibition design, way finding and public art. He designed and built, 'Steel, Stone and Backbone, Building NYC Subways 1900-1925' for  the  Brooklyn Transit Museum, and signage systems for the Lincoln Center and banners for the Lincoln Center and signage for Cornell University Performing Arts Center for architect Sir James Stirling. 'Memories of Twenty Third Street, a mosaic mural for the MTA, Arts for Transit installed in Subway Station on the R line in 2003.

From 2000 until 2009 he designed a series of  die-cut architecture lecture posters for the School of Architecture at the University of Virginia at Charlottesville. In 2015 he is designing scannable graphics for apps in print and mural forms.

Exhibitions 
'Image of the Studio' group exhibition Cooper Union Art Gallery 2014
'Unfolding Keith Godard' The 0-0-0-art-space Hangzhou P.R. China, 2011
Nanjing University School of Design P.R. China, 2012
'Le Pèrigord et New York en Images' Le Musée des Bastides, Monpazier, France, 2008
Les Musées des Belvès, France, 2009, 2012
'This Way That Way': a retrospective of work 1963-2003' Rosenwald-Wolff Gallery, Philadelphia, 2004
Cooper Union School of Art Gallery, 2005
'Images of an Era: The American Poster 1945-75' The Corcoran Gallery, Washington 1976
Collection of work in The Museum of Modern Art, Le Bibliothèque Nationale, Paris,
The Cooper-Hewitt Museum, Smithsonian Institution, The Cooper Union
National Archives in Washington DC

Publications including his work 
This Way -- That Way Lars Muller Publishers 
Design Firms Open For Business Steve Heller /Lita Talarico 
All Men Are Brothers Published by Hesign, China 2006 
Signs and Spaces Publisher: Rockport Publishers, 1994
"Keith Godard" by Laetitia Costes, in graphé Bulletin de l’association pour la promotion de l’art typographique No 59, July 2014, pages 8 – 15

References

External links
Keith Godard official website

1942 births
Living people